Rådström is a surname. Notable people with the surname include:

 Britta Rådström (born 1954), Swedish politician
 Hans Rådström (1919–1970), Swedish mathematician
 Karin Rådström (born 1979), Swedish engineer and business executive
 Lucette Rådström (born 1974), Swedish journalist 
 Niklas Rådström (born 1953), Swedish poet and writer
 Pär Rådström (1925-1963), Swedish writer and journalist
 Thomas Rådström (born 1966), Swedish rally and rallycross driver

Swedish-language surnames